Helen Sewell (June 27, 1896 – February 24, 1957) was an American illustrator and writer of children's books. She was a runner-up for the 1955 Caldecott Medal as illustrator of The Thanksgiving Story by Alice Dalgliesh and she illustrated several novels that were runners-up for the Newbery Medal.
Some of her papers were donated to the University of Minnesota.

Life

Sewell was born in Mare Island, California; her father was William Elbridge Sewell, who later became Governor of Guam. She studied at the  Pratt Institute, including classes with Alexander Archipenko. Her first book was published in 1923, The Cruise of the Little Dipper and Other Fairy Tales, written by Susanne Langer, and she continued to illustrate throughout her life, including some works for adults. Sewell was the first illustrator of the Little House series by Laura Ingalls Wilder (1932 to 1943), replaced by Garth Williams in 1953 and subsequent editions. She died on February 24, 1957, in New York City.

Works illustrated

1923 The Cruise of the Little Dipper and Other Fairy Tales, Susanne Langer
1928 Menagerie, Poems for Children, Mary Britton Miller
1929 Mr. Hermit Crab, Mimpsy Rhys
1931 A Head for Happy, Helen Sewell
1932 Little House in the Big Woods, Laura Ingalls Wilder
1932 The Dream Keeper, Langston Hughes
1932 Words to the Wise, Helen Sewell
1933 Blue Barns, Helen Sewell
1933 Farmer Boy, Laura Ingalls Wilder
1934 A First Bible, Jean West Maury
1934 Away Goes Sally, Elizabeth Coatsworth
1934 Bluebonnets for Lucinda, Frances Clarke Sayers
1934 Cinderella
1935 Anne Frances, Eliza Orne White
1935 Little House on the Prairie, Laura Ingalls Wilder
1935 Mrs. Hermit Crab, Mimpsy Rhys
1935 Peter and Gretchen of Old Nuremberg, Viola M. Jones
1935 A Round of Carols, T. Tertius Noble
1936 Ming and Mehitable, Helen Sewell
1936 Peggy and the Pony, Helen Sewell
1936 Ten Saints, Eleanor Farjeon
1937 Baby Island, Carol Ryrie Brink
1937 Old John, Máirín Cregan
1937 On the Banks of Plum Creek, Laura Ingalls Wilder (co-illustrated with Mildred Boyle)
1937 The Magic Hill, A. A. Milne
1937 The Princess and the Apple Tree, A. A. Milne
1938 The Young Brontës, Mary Louise Jarden
1939 Five Bushel Farm, Elizabeth Coatsworth
1939 By the Shores of Silver Lake, Laura Ingalls Wilder (co-illus. Boyle)
1940 The Fair American, Elizabeth Coatsworth
1939 The Long Winter, Laura Ingalls Wilder (co-illus. Boyle)
1940 Jimmy and Jemima, Helen Sewell
1940 (edition) Pride and Prejudice, Jane Austen
1941 (edition) The Dream Keeper and Other Poems, Langston Hughes
1941 Little Town on the Prairie, Laura Ingalls Wilder (co-illus. Boyle)
1941 Peggy and the Pup, Helen Sewell
1941 Tag-Along Tooloo, Frances Clarke Sayers
1942 The Blue-Eyed Lady, Ferenc Molnar
 1943 These Happy Golden Years, Laura Ingalls Wilder (co-illus. Boyle) – last of the original Little House books 
1944 A Bee in Her Bonnet, Eva Kristofferson
1944 Belinda the Mouse, Helen Sewell
1944 The Big Green Umbrella, Elizabeth Coatsworth
1944 Birthdays for Robin, Helen Sewell
1944 Boat Children of Canton, Marion B. Ward
1944 Christmas Magic, James S Tippett
1946 The Brave Bantam, Louise Seaman
1946 Once There Was a Little Boy, Dorothy Kunhardt
1946 The Wonderful Day, Elizabeth Coatsworth
1947 Three Tall Tales, Helen Sewell and Eleska
1948 All Around the Town, Phyllis McGinley
1948 Azor, Maude Crowley
1949 Azor and the Haddock, Maude Crowley
1951 Azor and the Blue-Eyed Cow, Maude Crowley
1951 Secrets and Surprises, Irmegarde Ebertle
1952 The Bears on Hemlock Mountain, Alice Dalgliesh
1952 The Colonel's Squad, Alf Evers
1952 Mrs. McThing, Mary Ellen Chase (co-illus. Madeleine Gekiere)
1952 (edition) Poems, Emily Dickinson
1952 The White Horse, Elizabeth Coatsworth
1953 Ten Saints, Eleanor Farjeon
1954 The Thanksgiving Story, Alice Dalgliesh
1955 The Three Kings of Saba, Alf Evers
1957 (edition) Sense and Sensibility, Jane Austen

See also

References

External links
 
 
 

1896 births
1957 deaths
American children's book illustrators
American children's writers
American women illustrators
Artists from Vallejo, California
Writers from Vallejo, California
20th-century American women artists
20th-century American people